Austrophasma rawsonvillense is a species of insect in the family Mantophasmatidae. It is endemic to western South Africa, where it is found in a restricted area near Rawsonville, Tweefontein, and Gansbaai, Western Cape Province.

References

Mantophasmatidae
Insects of South Africa
Endemic fauna of South Africa